The Madwoman of Chaillot is a 1969 American satirical film made by Commonwealth United Entertainment and distributed by Warner Bros.-Seven Arts. It was directed by Bryan Forbes and produced by Ely A. Landau with Anthony B. Unger as associate producer. The screenplay was by Edward Anhalt, based on The Madwoman of Chaillot, Maurice Valency's adaption of La Folle de Chaillot by Jean Giraudoux. The music score was by Michael J. Lewis and the cinematography by Burnett Guffey and Claude Renoir. It was shot at the Victorine Studios in Nice and on location in Paris. The film's sets were designed by the art director Ray Simm.

The film stars Katharine Hepburn with Paul Henreid, Oskar Homolka, Yul Brynner, Richard Chamberlain, Edith Evans and Donald Pleasence.

A musical version of the play titled Dear World with music and lyrics by Jerry Herman, and starring Angela Lansbury, opened with little success on Broadway in 1969.

Plot
The story is of a modern society endangered by power and greed and the rebellion of the "little people" against corrupt and soulless authority.

A group of four prominent men – The General (Paul Henreid), The Commissar (Oskar Homolka), The Chairman (Yul Brynner) and The Prospector (Donald Pleasence) – discuss how they can increase their fortunes. The Prospector tells them that there is oil in the middle of Paris and they resolve to acquire the rights with or without the consent of the people of Paris. Countess Aurelia (Katharine Hepburn), the "madwoman" of the title, learns of this plan to drill for oil under the very streets of her district from Roderick (Richard Chamberlain) – an activist – and The Ragpicker (Danny Kaye). She enlists the help of her friends, a motley crew of "little people" who include, Constance (Margaret Leighton) and Gabrielle (Giulietta Masina). A trial takes place in the Countess's cellar presided over by Aurelia's friend Josephine (Edith Evans) as judge and the Ragpicker as the lawyer for the defense.

Cast

 Katharine Hepburn – Countess Aurelia, the Madwoman of Chaillot
 Charles Boyer – The Broker
 Claude Dauphin  – Dr. Jadin
 Margaret Leighton – Constance
 Edith Evans – Josephine
 John Gavin  – The Reverend
 Giulietta Masina  – Gabrielle
 Paul Henreid  – The General
 Oskar Homolka  – The Commissar
 Nanette Newman  – Irma
 Richard Chamberlain  – Roderick
 Yul Brynner  – The Chairman
 Donald Pleasence  – The Prospector
 Danny Kaye  – The Ragpicker
 Fernand Gravey  – Police sergeant
 Gordon Heath  – The Folksinger
 Gerald Sim  – Julius
 Gilles Ségal  – Deaf Mute

Release
The film had its premiere at The Plaza in New York City on Sunday, October 12, 1969.

Critical reception
In The New York Times, Vincent Canby wrote "Forbes, who persists in making conventional films of unconventional properties ("Whistle Down The Wind", "The Wrong Box") moves his cameras around quite a lot, but there is really little he can do to hide the fact that "The Madwoman of Chaillot" is—as it was 20 years ago—an incredibly precious theatrical conceit, just the sort of thing somebody might think would make a great Broadway musical comedy. As we all know, it didn't."

See also
 List of American films of 1969

References

External links
 

1969 films
1969 comedy-drama films
1960s satirical films
American comedy-drama films
American satirical films
American films based on plays
Films directed by Bryan Forbes
Films produced by Ely Landau
Films set in Paris
Films shot in France
Films shot at Victorine Studios
Warner Bros. films
Films with screenplays by Edward Anhalt
1960s English-language films
1960s American films